Lo Yiu Hung (born 30 January 1978) is a former Hong Kong professional footballer.

Career statistics

Club

Notes

References

External links
 Yau Yee Football League profile
 

Living people
1978 births
Hong Kong footballers
Association football defenders
Hong Kong First Division League players
Hong Kong FC players